Rennes is the capital city of the region of Brittany in northwestern France.
Rennes or Rennais may also refer to:

Geography 
Rennes-le-Château, a commune in the region of Occitanie in southern France
Rennes-les-Bains, a commune in the region of Occitanie in southern France
Rennes-en-Grenouilles, a commune in the region of Pays de la Loire in northwestern France
Rennes-sur-Loue, a commune in the region of Bourgogne-Franche-Comté in eastern France
Rennes (Paris Métro), a station on the Paris Métro
Rue de Rennes, a main street in the 6th arrondissement of Paris, France

Other uses
University of Rennes, established in 1885, now known as University of Rennes 1 and University of Rennes 2
Stade Rennais F.C., a French football club
Radio Rennes Bretagne, a radio station that broadcast programs in the Breton language during the German occupation of France during World War II
Jacques Rennes, a French philosopher and veterinarian
6190 Rennes, an asteroid
Rennes, a fictional character in the 1997 film Cube